New York State Route 178 (NY 178) is an east–west state highway in Jefferson County, New York, in the United States. When NY 178 was assigned in the 1930 renumbering of state highways in New York, it continued east along modern County Route 189 (CR 189) to NY 177 in Rodman. This extension was eliminated in 1979. From the early 1930s to the late 1960s, NY 178 also continued west toward Lake Ontario on what is now County Route 178.

Route description
NY 178 continues eastward from NY 3, passing through a small populated region before entering the hamlet of Henderson. There, the route intersects with the southern terminus of  CR 72 (Penney Road). NY 178 turns to the south along CR 72's right-of-way (now with the moniker of Adams Road), turns to the southeast, and leaves the hamlet of Henderson. After intersecting with Town Barn Road, the highway continues southeastward, passing Henderson Pond and curving to the east at an intersection with CR 78 (Clark Road). NY 178 curves back to the southeast and intersects with CR 152 (Smith Road), where the right-of-ways merge. From there, NY 178 begins an eastward progression through the North Country, entering the community of Roberts Corner at an intersection with CR 75 (Butterville Road). After crossing through the rural community, the highway turns to the southeast and intersects with the northern terminus of NY 289 in the community of Taylor Settlement.

After intersecting with NY 289, NY 178 progresses northeastward, intersecting with the western terminus of CR 84 in the community of Thomas Settlement. After leaving Thomas Settlement, NY 178 intersects with CR 77 and turning to the southeast through a rural region before entering the village of Adams at an intersection with Cobbville Road. There, the surroundings become further residential, before the highway connects to I-81 at exit 41. After the interchange, NY 178 becomes known as Church Street West, crosses over a railroad line and enters the downtown portion of Adams. After the intersection with Clay Street, NY 178 intersects with US 11 (Main Street), where the NY 178 designation ends. The right-of-way continues eastward as Church Street East, which becomes CR 69 at the east village line.

History
When NY 178 was assigned as part of the 1930 renumbering of state highways in New York, it began at NY 3C (later NY 3) south of the hamlet (then village) of Henderson and ended at NY 177 west of Barnes Corners. In between, NY 178 passed through the village of Adams, where it had a short overlap with US 11. NY 178 was extended northwestward  along then-NY 3D and Military Road to a new terminus at Snowshoe Road northwest of Henderson. By the following year, NY 3D was moved onto the current alignment of NY 3 in the vicinity of Henderson, eliminating its overlap with NY 178.

NY 178 was truncated eastward in the late 1960s to begin at NY 3 west of Henderson. It was truncated westward to US 11 in Adams on August 1, 1979, after ownership and maintenance of NY 178 between US 11 and NY 177 was transferred from the state of New York to Jefferson County as part of a highway maintenance swap between the two levels of government. The former routing of NY 178 between Snowshoe Road and NY 3 in the town of Henderson is now maintained by Jefferson County as CR 178 while the section of old NY 178 from US 11 to NY 177 is designated as CR 189.

Major intersections

See also

List of county routes in Jefferson County, New York

References

External links

178
Transportation in Jefferson County, New York